Úrvalsdeild kvenna; English: Women's Premier League, also known as Olís deild kvenna for sponsorship reasons, is the highest women's handball competition among clubs in Iceland, where play determines the national champion. It is managed by the Icelandic Handball Association.

The current champions are KA/Þór who won the national championship for the 1st time in 2021.

2021/22 Season participants 
The following 8 clubs compete in the Olís deild karla during the 2021–22 season.

Úrvalsdeild kvenna past champions

 1940 : Ármann
 1941 : Ármann (2)
 1942 : Ármann (3)
 1943 : Ármann (4)
 1944 : Ármann (5)
 1945 : Haukar
 1946 : Haukar (2)
 1947 : Ármann (6)
 1948 : Ármann (7)
 1949 : Ármann (8)
 1950 : Fram 
 1951 : Fram (2)
 1952 : Fram (3)
 1953 : Fram (4)
 1954 : Fram (5)
 1955 : KR
 1956 : Ármann (9)
 1957 : Þróttur Reykjavík
 1958 : Ármann (9)
 1959 : KR (2)
 1960 : Ármann (11)
 1961 : FH Hafnarfjörður
 1962 : Valur
 1963 : Ármann (12)
 1964 : Valur (2)
 1965 : Valur (3)
 1966 : Valur (4)
 1967 : Valur (5)
 1968 : Valur (6)
 1969 : Valur (7)
 1970 : Fram (7)
 1971 : Valur (8)
 1972 : Valur (9)
 1973 : Valur (10)
 1974 : Fram (7)
 1975 : Valur (11)
 1976 : Fram (8)
 1977 : Fram (9)
 1978 : Fram (10)
 1979 : Fram (11)
 1980 : Fram (12)
 1981 : FH Hafnarfjörður (2)
 1982 : FH Hafnarfjörður (3)
 1983 : Valur (12)
 1984 : Fram (13)
 1985 : Fram (14)
 1986 : Fram (15)
 1987 : Fram (16)
 1988 : Fram (17)
 1989 : Fram (18)
 1990 : Fram (19)
 1991 : Stjarnan
 1992 : Víkingur Reykjavík
 1993 : Víkingur Reykjavík (2)
 1994 : Víkingur Reykjavík (3)
 1995 : Stjarnan (2)
 1996 : Haukar 
 1997 : Haukar (2)
 1998 : Stjarnan (3)
 1999 : Stjarnan (4)
 2000 : ÍBV
 2001 : Haukar (5)
 2002 : Haukar (6)
 2003 : ÍBV (2)
 2004 : ÍBV (3)
 2005 : Haukar (7)
 2006 : ÍBV (4)
 2007 : Stjarnan (5)
 2008 : Stjarnan (6)
 2009 : Stjarnan (7)
 2010 : Valur (13)
 2011 : Valur (14)
 2012 : Valur (15)
 2013 : Fram (20)
 2014 : Valur (16)
 2015 : Grótta
 2016 : Grótta (2)
 2017 : Fram (21)
 2018 : Fram (22)
 2019 : Valur (17)
 2020 : Not awarded due to the COVID-19 pandemic
 2021 : KA/Þór (1)
 2022 : Fram (23)

Awards

Playoffs MVP

See also
 Úrvalsdeild kvenna (disambiguation)
 Úrvalsdeild karla (handball), the men's handball league

References

External links 
 Úrvalsdeild kvenna 2017–2018
 HSÍ regulations on Úrvalsdeild kvenna

Ice
Handball leagues in Iceland
Professional sports leagues in Iceland